Charles Louis Dimry, III (born January 31, 1966) is a former American football cornerback in the National Football League for the Atlanta Falcons, Denver Broncos, Tampa Bay Buccaneers, Philadelphia Eagles, and the San Diego Chargers. After graduating from Oceanside High School he continued on to play college football at the University of Nevada, Las Vegas. He was drafted by the Falcons and played 12 years in the NFL. He was twice awarded the NFL's Ed Block Courage Award and was twice named the Chargers' Most Inspirational Player. He resides in Carlsbad, California, with his wife Erin and their six children: Erin, CArlee, CJ, Sophie, Soleil, and Gia. After retiring from the NFL, he coached at USD with Jim Harbaugh. He is a previous owner of the Velocity Sports Performance training facilities in San Diego. He also is a correspondent for San Diego's prep football show Prep Pigskin Report with his own segment.

References

1966 births
Living people
American football cornerbacks
UNLV Rebels football players
Atlanta Falcons players
Denver Broncos players
Tampa Bay Buccaneers players
Philadelphia Eagles players
San Diego Chargers players
Sportspeople from Carlsbad, California
Players of American football from San Diego
Ed Block Courage Award recipients